Ian MacLachlan Arrol (February 20, 1924 – June 16, 2000) was Member of Parliament for the federal riding of York East, elected as a Progressive Conservative in the Robert Stanfield-led resurgence of 1972.  He was defeated in the Liberal sweep of 1974.

Radio career
Arrol was a radio announcer in Vancouver and Calgary in the 1940s and 1950s until graduating from University of British Columbia and teachers college, teaching in Vancouver in the early 1960s and for the Scarborough Board of Education (at Woburn Collegiate Institute) in the late 1960s and early 1970s.  He also was a reporter with the Daily Colonist in Victoria BC in the mid-1960s.

Political career
Arrol's first foray into electoral politics was with a different party:  he ran as a Co-operative Commonwealth Federation (CCF) candidate in the 1948 Alberta general election in the electoral district of Medicine Hat. He finished a distant third, losing to longtime Social Credit incumbent John Robinson.

References

External links
 

1924 births
2000 deaths
Members of the House of Commons of Canada from Ontario
Progressive Conservative Party of Canada MPs